A gubernatorial election was held on 7 April 2019 to elect the next governor of Tokushima.

Candidates 
Kamon Iizumi back by national LDP and Komeito.
Atsushi Amou for the JCP.
Taiji Kishimoto, ex-prefectoral MP, back by the local section of LDP.

Results

References 

Tokushima gubernatorial elections
2019 elections in Japan